Qilong station can refer to:
Qilong station (Chengdu Metro), a metro station in Chengdu, China
Qilong station (Chongqing Rail Transit), a metro station in Chongqing, China